Anne Susan Bassett is a Canadian psychiatrist, specifically in mental behaviour. She is a full professor and Canada Research Chair in Schizophrenia Genetics and Genomic Disorders at University of Toronto. Bassett is also a Clinician Scientist at CAMH and a Senior Scientist at the Toronto General Research Institute. As a result of her work in psychiatry, Bassett was awarded a Distinguished Fellowship from the American Psychiatric Association.

References

Academic staff of the University of Toronto
Canadian psychiatrists
Living people
Canadian women psychiatrists
Year of birth missing (living people)